A list of Catholic churches in the United Kingdom, notable current and former individual church buildings and congregations and administration. These churches are listed buildings or have been recognised for their historical importance, or are church congregations notable for reasons unrelated to their buildings. These generally are or were members of the Catholic Church in the United Kingdom, including the Catholic Church in Scotland, the Catholic Church of England and Wales and the Catholic Church in Northern Ireland.

England
Sorted according to the ceremonial counties of England, although there are also 20 Catholic dioceses in England, divided into 5 ecclesiastical provinces: Birmingham, Cardiff, Liverpool, Southwark and Westminster.

Bedfordshire 
In the Diocese of Northampton:
Church of the Sacred Heart of Jesus and St Cuthbert
Our Lady Help of Christians Church, Luton
 Turvey Abbey

Berkshire 
In the Diocese of Portsmouth:
Douai Abbey
 St Cassian's Centre, Kintbury
 St Joseph's Church, Maidenhead
 St Joseph's Church, Newbury
St James's Church, Reading
Reading Abbey
Sacred Heart Church, Reading

In the Diocese of Northampton:
St Ethelbert's Church, Slough

Bristol 
In the Diocese of Clifton:
Clifton Cathedral
Pro-Cathedral of the Holy Apostles
St James' Priory, Bristol
St Mary on the Quay

Buckinghamshire 
In the Diocese of Northampton:
St Bernardine's Catholic Church, Buckingham
 Church of Christ the Cornerstone (shared)

Cambridgeshire 
In the Diocese of East Anglia:
 Buckden Towers
Cambridge University Catholic Chaplaincy, Cambridge
 Cambridge Blackfriars
St Laurence's Church, Cambridge
Our Lady and the English Martyrs Church, Cambridge
Our Lady & Saint Charles Borromeo Church, Wisbech
Our Lady and the English Martyrs Church
Sacred Heart Church, St Ives
St Etheldreda's Church, Ely
St Olga Ukrainian Catholic Church
St Peter and All Souls, Peterborough

Cheshire 
In the Diocese of Shrewsbury:
Church of St. Cuthbert by the Forest
St Mary's Church, Congleton
St Mary's Church, Crewe
 Curzon Park Abbey
Church of St Mary of the Angels, Hooton
St Alban's Church, Macclesfield
St Francis' Church, Chester
St Werburgh's Church, Chester
St Winefride's, Sandbach
St Columba's Church, Chester

In the Archdiocese of Liverpool:
St Michael's Church, Ditton
St Oswald's Church, Padgate
St Alban's Church, Warrington
St Mary's Church, Warrington
St Benedict's Church, Warrington
St Bede's Church, Widnes

Cornwall 
In the Diocese of Plymouth:
 St Mary Immaculate Church, Falmouth
Glasney College
Parish Church of St Mary and St Petroc
Sclerder Abbey
 St Mawgan Monastery
St Paul's Church, Tintagel
St Thomas Becket chapel, Bodmin

Cumbria 
In the Diocese of Lancaster:
St Mary of Furness Roman Catholic Church
Church of Holy Trinity and St George, Kendal
Our Lady and St Joseph's Church, Carlisle
Our Lady and St Wilfrid's Church, Warwick Bridge
 St Begh's Church, Whitehaven
 Our Lady and St Michael's Church, Workington

Derbyshire 
In the Diocese of Nottingham:
Our Lady of Sorrows Church, Bamford
Church of All Saints, Hassop
St Mary's Church, Derby

In the Diocese of Hallam:
Annunciation Church, Chesterfield
Padley Chapel
Church of the Immaculate Conception, Spinkhill

Devon 
In the Diocese of Plymouth:
Plymouth Cathedral
Buckfast Abbey
Our Lady and St Nectan's Church, Hartland
Sacred Heart Church, Exeter
 Church of the Assumption of Our Lady, Torquay
 Our Lady Help of Christians and St Denis Church, Torquay

Dorset 
In the Diocese of Plymouth:
Church of Our Lady and St Andrew, Portland
Holy Trinity Church, Dorchester
St Joseph's Church, Weymouth

In the Diocese of Portsmouth:
Corpus Christi Church, Boscombe
Sacred Heart Church, Bournemouth
 Our Lady Queen of Peace and Blessed Margaret Pole, Southborne

Durham 
In the Diocese of Hexham and Newcastle:
 St Augustine's Church, Darlington
 St Cuthbert's Church, Durham
 St Joseph's Church, Hartlepool
 St Mary's Church, Hartlepool
 St Mary's Church, Stockton-on-Tees

East Sussex 
In the Diocese of Arundel and Brighton:
Church of St Thomas More, Seaford
Our Lady of Ransom Church, Eastbourne
St George's Church, Polegate
Church of St Thomas of Canterbury and English Martyrs, St Leonards-on-Sea
St Mary Star of the Sea Church, Hastings
St Wilfrid's Church, Hailsham
St Anthony of Padua Church, Rye
St John the Evangelist Church, Heron's Ghyll
St Mary Magdalene's Church, Bexhill-on-Sea

Brighton and Hove
St Peter's Church, Aldrington
St John the Baptist's Church, Brighton
Church of the Sacred Heart, Hove
St Joseph's Church, Brighton
St Mary Magdalen's Church, Brighton
St Mary's Church, Preston Park

Essex 
In the Diocese of Brentwood:
Brentwood Cathedral
 Chapel of the Immaculate Conception, Franciscan Convent
 Our Lady Queen of Peace Church, Braintree
St James the Less and St Helen Church, Colchester
Our Lady Help of Christians and St Helen's Church, Westcliff-on-Sea
Our Lady Immaculate Church, Chelmsford

Gloucestershire 
In the Diocese of Clifton:
St Mary of the Angels Church, Brownshill
St Gregory's Church, Cheltenham
St Peter's Church, Gloucester
Mythe Chapel
Odda's Chapel
 Prinknash Abbey
Convent of Poor Clares, Woodchester

Greater Manchester 
In the Diocese of Salford:
List of parishes in the Diocese of Salford
Salford Cathedral
Church of the Holy Name of Jesus, Manchester
Corpus Christi Priory, Manchester
Gorton Monastery
St Wilfrid's Church, Hulme
All Saints' Church, Urmston
St Chad's, Cheetham Hill
Corpus Christi Priory
Gorton Monastery
The Hidden Gem
Our Lady of Mount Carmel and St Patrick Church, Oldham
St John the Baptist Church, Rochdale
St Patrick's Church, Bolton
 St Marie's Church, Bury
St Joseph's Church, Stockport
Our Lady and the Apostles Church, Stockport
St Ann's, Stretford
In the Archdiocese of Liverpool:
 Catholic Church of St Oswald and St Edmund Arrowsmith, Ashton-in-Makerfield
 Sacred Heart Roman Catholic Church, Hindsford
St Joseph's Roman Catholic Church, Leigh
St John's Church, Wigan
St Jude's Church, Wigan
St Mary's Church, Wigan

Eastern Catholic:

 St Mary's Ukrainian Catholic Church, Manchester

Hampshire 
In the Diocese of Portsmouth:
Cathedral of St John the Evangelist, Portsmouth
Cathedral of St Michael and St George, Aldershot (Bishopric of the Forces)
 St Michael's Abbey, Farnborough
St Denys Priory, Southampton
St Joseph's Church, Aldershot
 Holy Ghost Church, Basingstoke
St Agatha's, Landport (Ordinariate)
St Peter's Church, Winchester
St Edmund's Church, Southampton
St Joseph's Church, Southampton

Herefordshire 
In the Archdiocese of Cardiff:
Belmont Abbey, Herefordshire
St Francis Xavier Church, Hereford
Longworth Roman Catholic Chapel

Hertfordshire 
In the Diocese of Westminster:
Benson Memorial Church
Holy Rood Church, Watford
Church of St Hugh of Lincoln, Letchworth
 St Alban and St Stephen's Church, St Albans

Isle of Wight 
In the Diocese of Portsmouth:
St Thomas of Canterbury Church, Newport, Isle of Wight
 Quarr Abbey
 St Cecilia's Abbey, Ryde

Kent 
In the Archdiocese of Southwark:
St Augustine's Abbey
 Aylesford Priory
 National Shrine of Saint Jude, Faversham
Shrine of Our Lady, Bradstowe
St Thomas of Canterbury Church, Canterbury
St Michael the Archangel Church, Chatham
St. Mary's, Chislehurst
St Paul's Church, Dover
Our Lady of Gillingham Church
St Mary's Church, Nettlestead
 St Anselm's Church, Pembury (Ordinariate)
St Augustine's Church, Ramsgate
St Augustine's Abbey, Ramsgate
St Ethelbert's Church, Ramsgate
 Minster in Thanet Priory

Lancashire 
In the Diocese of Lancaster:
Lancaster Cathedral
Syro-Malabar Cathedral of St Alphonsa, Preston (Syro-Malabar)
Church of St Thomas of Canterbury and the English Martyrs, Preston
Church of St Walburge, Preston
St Joseph's Church, Preston
St Wilfrid's Church, Preston
Sacred Heart Church, Blackpool
Shrine of Our Lady of Lourdes, Blackpool
Church of St Mary and St Michael, Bonds
St Mary's Church, Fernyhalgh
St Mary's Church, Fleetwood
St Patrick's Chapel, Heysham
St John the Evangelist's Church, Kirkham
St Mary's Church, Morecambe
Church of St John the Evangelist, Poulton-le-Fylde
St Mary's Church, Yealand Conyers

In the Diocese of Salford:
St Anne's Church, Blackburn
Church of St Mary of the Assumption, Burnley
St Michael and St John Church, Clitheroe
Christ Church, Nelson
Pleasington Priory
St Peter's Church, Stonyhurst

Leicestershire 
In the Diocese of Nottingham:
Holy Cross Priory, Leicester, Wellington Street
St Patrick's Catholic Church, Leicester Beaumont Leys Lane
St Thomas More's Catholic Church, Leicester
 St Mary's Church, Loughborough
Mount St Bernard Abbey, near Coalville
Rothley Temple, in the village of Rothley

Lincolnshire 
In the Diocese of Nottingham:
 St Mary's Church, Grantham
Holy Rood Church, Market Rasen
St Hugh's Church, Lincoln
Church of St Mary and St Augustine, Stamford
St Mary's Church, Grimsby

London 
In the Diocese of Westminster:
 Westminster Cathedral
 St Mary of the Angels Church, Bayswater
 St Casimir's Lithuanian Church
 Brompton Oratory
 Our Lady of Dolours Church, Chelsea
 Church of Our Most Holy Redeemer and St Thomas More, Chelsea
 St Mary's Church, Cadogan Street
 Church of Our Lady of Grace & St Edward, Chiswick
 Church of Our Lady of Hal, Camden
 St Dominic's Priory Church, Camden
 Christ the King, Cockfosters
 Ealing Abbey
 St Etheldreda's Church, Ely Place
 English Martyrs Church, Tower Hill
 St Thomas of Canterbury Church, Fulham
 St Augustine's Church, Hammersmith
 Holy Trinity Church, Brook Green
 St Andrew Bobola Church, Hammersmith
 St Francis de Sales, Hampton Hill and Upper Teddington
 St Theodore's Church, Hampton
 Our Lady Queen of Apostles Church, Heston
 St Joseph's Church, Highgate
 St Peter's Italian Church, Clerkenwell
 Our Lady of Victories Church, Kensington
 Our Lady of Perpetual Help Church, Fulham
 Church of the Immaculate Conception, Farm Street
 Mary Immaculate and St Peter Church, New Barnet
 St John's Church, North Woolwich (Shared)
 Notre Dame de France Church
 Our Lady and St Thomas of Canterbury Church, Harrow
 St Monica's Church, Palmers Green
  Our Lady of Mount Carmel and St Simon Stock, Kensington
 Sacred Heart Church, Kilburn
 St James's Church, Spanish Place
 Corpus Christi Church, Maiden Lane
 St Mary Moorfields
 St Monica's Church, Hoxton
 St Patrick's Church, Soho Square
 St Anselm's Church, Southall
 St Ignatius Church, Stamford Hill
 Sacred Heart Church, Teddington
 Church of St Mary and St Michael, Tower Hamlets
 Church of St James, Twickenham
 Church of St Margaret of Scotland, Twickenham
 Tyburn Convent
 Our Lady of the Assumption and St Gregory Church, Westminster (Ordinariate)
 St Mary Magdalen Church, Whetstone
 St Edmund of Canterbury Church, Whitton

In the Archdiocese of Southwark:
 St George's Cathedral, Southwark
 Sacred Heart Church, Battersea
 Corpus Christi Church, Brixton
 St Osmund's Church, Barnes
 Sacred Heart Church, Camberwell
 St Mary's Church, Clapham
 St Thomas More Church, Dulwich
 Our Lady of the Angels Church, Erith
 St Thomas Aquinas Church, Ham
 Our Lady of Loreto and St Winefride's Church, Kew
 St Agatha's Church, Kingston
 St Mary Magdalen Church, Mortlake
 Polish Church of St. John the Evangelist, Putney
 Our Lady Queen of Peace Church, Richmond
 St Elizabeth of Portugal Church, Richmond
 St Joseph Church, Roehampton
 Church of the Most Precious Blood, Southwark (Ordinariate)
 Sts Simon and Jude Church, Streatham Hill
 St Raphael's Church, Surbiton
 St Anne's Church, Vauxhall
 St Patrick's Church, Waterloo
 Our Lady of Willesden Church
 Christ the King Church, Wimbledon Park
 St Winefride Church, South Wimbledon
 Sacred Heart Church, Wimbledon
 St Peter's Church, Woolwich

In the Diocese of Brentwood:
 Brentwood Cathedral
 Our Lady of Grace and St Teresa of Avila Church, Chingford
 St Nicholas' Chapel, Manor Park
 St Francis of Assisi Church, Stratford
 Our Lady of Compassion Church, Upton Park
 Our Lady of Lourdes, Wanstead
 St Thomas of Canterbury Church, Woodford Green

Eastern Catholic:
 Ukrainian Catholic Cathedral of the Holy Family in Exile
 Church of St Cyril of Turau and All the Patron Saints of the Belarusian People
 Syro-Malabar Catholic Church of London

Merseyside 
In the Archdiocese of Liverpool:
 Liverpool Metropolitan Cathedral
St Clare's Church, Liverpool
St Peter's Roman Catholic Church, Liverpool
Church of St Vincent de Paul, Liverpool
St Anne's Church, Edge Hill, Liverpool
St Francis Xavier Church, Liverpool
St Austin's Church, Grassendale, Liverpool
St John the Evangelist's Church, Kirkdale, Liverpool
Church of Our Lady of Reconciliation, Liverpool
Saint Philip Neri Church, Liverpool
St. Aloysius Catholic Church (Liverpool)
Our Lady of Mount Carmel RC Church, Liverpool
 Our Lady of the Annunciation Church, Liverpool
Sacred Heart Church, Liverpool
 St Anthony of Padua Church, Liverpool
St Anthony's Church, Scotland Road, Liverpool
St Ambrose's Church, Speke, Liverpool
St Mary of the Angels, Liverpool, England
St Oswald's Church, Old Swan, Liverpool
St Patrick's Church, Liverpool
St Sylvester's Church, Vauxhall, Liverpool
St Paul's Church, West Derby, Liverpool
St Mary's Church, Woolton, Liverpool
St Mary's Church, Billinge
Church of St Teresa of Avila, Birkdale
St Joseph's Church, Birkdale
Church of St Monica, Bootle
Church of the Holy Family, Ince Blundell
St Mary's Church, Presbytery and Convent, Little Crosby
Our Lady Help of Christians Church, Portico
Our Lady Star of the Sea, Seaforth
Our Lady Immaculate and St Joseph Church, Prescot
St Bartholomew's Church, Rainhill
Church of St Mary, Lowe House
Holy Cross Church, St Helens

In the Diocese of Shrewsbury:
Church of Our Lady of the Immaculate Conception, Birkenhead
St Werburgh's Church, Birkenhead
St Peter and St Paul's Church, New Brighton
St Anne's Church, Rock Ferry
Church of Our Lady Star of the Sea, Wallasey
English Martyrs' Church, Wallasey
St Alban's Church, Wallasey

Norfolk 
In the Diocese of East Anglia:
St John the Baptist Cathedral, Norwich
St Dominic, Downham Market
St Mary's Church, Great Yarmouth
 Our Lady of the Annunciation Church, King's Lynn
 Quidenham Hall
Basilica of Our Lady of Walsingham

Northamptonshire 
In the Diocese of Northampton:
Northampton Cathedral
St Bernardine's Catholic Church, Buckingham
St Martin's Catholic Church, Brackley
 Our Lady of Perpetual Succour Church, Great Billing
 Our Lady of the Sacred Heart Church, Wellingborough

Northumberland 
In the Diocese of Hexham and Newcastle:
 Our Lady and St Cuthbert Church, Berwick
Biddlestone Chapel
 St Mary's Church, Hexham
 Minsteracres
 St Robert of Newminster Church, Morpeth
St Ninian's Catholic Church, Wooler

Nottinghamshire 
In the Diocese of Nottingham:

Nottingham Cathedral
 St Philip Neri Church, Mansfield
Church of the Good Shepherd, Nottingham
St John the Evangelist's Catholic Church, Nottingham

In the Diocese of Hallam:
 St Mary's Church, Worksop

Eastern Catholic:
 St Alban's Church, Sneinton (Ukrainian Catholic)

Oxfordshire 
In the Archdiocese of Birmingham:
 St John the Evangelist Church, Banbury
Holy Trinity Church, Chipping Norton
 Blackfriars, Oxford
Oxford Oratory
 Oxford University Catholic Chaplaincy
St Anthony of Padua, Oxford
 St Edmund and St Frideswide Church, Oxford

In the Diocese of Portsmouth:
 Our Lady and St Edmund's Church, Abingdon

Shropshire 
In the Diocese of Shrewsbury:
Shrewsbury Cathedral
Greyfriars, Shrewsbury
 St Mary's Church, Madeley
St Peter and Paul Church, Newport

Somerset 
In the Diocese of Clifton:
St John's Church, Bath
Church of Our Lady & St Alphege, Bath
 Immaculate Conception Church, Clevedon
 Downside Abbey
 The Church of Our Lady St Mary of Glastonbury
Church of the Holy Ghost, Midsomer Norton
 Roman Catholic Church of St Teresa of Lisieux, Taunton
St George's Roman Catholic Church, Taunton
 St Joseph's Church, Weston-super-Mare

Staffordshire 
In the Archdiocese of Birmingham:
 St Mary and St Modwen Church, Burton-on-Trent
St Giles' Catholic Church, Cheadle
 St Mary's Abbey, Colwich
St Wilfrid's Church, Cotton
 Holy Trinity Church, Newcastle-under-Lyme
 St Austin's Church, Stafford
Our Lady of the Angels and St Peter in Chains Church, Stoke-on-Trent
St Mary's Catholic Church, Uttoxeter

Suffolk 
In the Diocese of East Anglia:
Mary Magdalen, Ipswich
St Pancras Church, Ipswich
St James, Ipswich
St Mark, Ipswich
St Mary, Woodbridge Road, Ipswich
St Edmund's Church, Bury St Edmunds
Catholic Church in Sudbury, Suffolk
Church of Our Lady and St Peter, Aldeburgh
Church of St Thomas of Canterbury, Woodbridge
Clare Priory
Coldham Cottage
Our Lady Star of the Sea Church, Lowestoft

Surrey 
In the Diocese of Arundel and Brighton:
St Tarcisius Church, Camberley
Sacred Heart Church, Caterham
St Teresa of Avila Church, Chiddingfold
St Augustine's Abbey, Chilworth
St Joseph's Church, Dorking
Church of Our Lady of the Assumption, Englefield Green
St Joan of Arc's Church, Farnham
St Edmund Church, Godalming
Church of Our Lady and St Peter, Leatherhead
All Saints Church, Oxted
St Dunstan's Church, Woking

Tyne and Wear 
In the Diocese of Hexham and Newcastle:
St Mary's Cathedral, Newcastle upon Tyne
St Joseph's Roman Catholic Church, Gateshead
Holy Name parish, Jesmond
 St Dominic's Church, Newcastle
Sacred Heart Church, North Gosforth
 St Benet's Church, Sunderland
St Mary's Church, Sunderland

Warwickshire 
In the Archdiocese of Birmingham:
St Francis of Assisi, Bedworth
St Peter and St Paul and St Elizabeth Catholic Church, Coughton
 St Peter's Church, Leamington Spa
Our Lady of the Angels, Nuneaton
St Anne's, Chapel End, Nuneaton
St Marie's Church, Rugby
St Mary Immaculate Roman Catholic Church, Warwick

West Sussex 
In the Diocese of Arundel and Brighton:
Arundel Cathedral
Our Lady of England Priory
St Wilfrid's Church, Burgess Hill
English Martyrs' Catholic Church, Goring-by-Sea
Fitzalan Chapel
Friary Church of St Francis and St Anthony, Crawley
Our Lady and St Peter's Church, East Grinstead
Our Lady of Sorrows Church, Bognor Regis
 St Hugh's Charterhouse, Parkminster
Sacred Heart Church, Petworth
St Richard of Chichester Church, Chichester
St Peter's Church, Shoreham-by-Sea
Shrine Church of Our Lady of Consolation and St Francis
St Catherine's Church, Littlehampton
Worth Abbey
St Mary of the Angels, Worthing

West Midlands 
In the Archdiocese of Birmingham:
St Chad's Cathedral, Birmingham
St Michael's Catholic Church, Moor Street, Birmingham
St Catherine of Siena Church, Birmingham
St Edward's Church, Selly Park, Birmingham
Erdington Abbey, Birmingham
St Francis of Assisi Church, Handsworth, Birmingham
 St Mary's Convent, Handsworth
St Mary's Church, Harborne, Birmingham
Our Lady and St Brigid's Church, Northfield, Birmingham
Birmingham Oratory, Birmingham
Our Lady Help of Christians Church, Tile Cross, Birmingham
St Anne's Church, Birmingham
Church of Our Lady and St Rose of Lima, Weoley Castle, Birmingham
St Osburg's Church, Coventry
 St Mary's Church, Walsall
St Mary and St John Church, Wolverhampton
St Peter and St Paul's Church, Wolverhampton
 Carmelite Monastery, Wolverhampton

Wiltshire 
In the Diocese of Clifton:
St Thomas More Roman Catholic Church, Bradford-on-Avon
 St Aldhelm's Roman Catholic Church, Malmesbury
 St Osmund's Church, Salisbury
Holy Rood Church, Swindon

Worcestershire 
In the Archdiocese of Birmingham:
Church of the Sacred Heart and St Catherine, Droitwich Spa
 Our Lady of Mount Carmel Church, Redditch
St George's Church, Worcester

Yorkshire 
East Riding
In the Diocese of Middlesbrough:
 St John of Beverley Church, Beverley
 Our Lady and St Peter's Church, Bridlington
Ss Mary & Everilda, Everingham
St Charles Borromeo, Hull

North Yorkshire
In the Diocese of Middlesbrough:
 Middlesbrough Cathedral
 Ampleforth Abbey
Ss Leonard & Mary, Malton
Sacred Heart Church, Middlesbrough
St Clare of Assisi, Middlesbrough
St Bernadette's, Nunthorpe
St Joseph and St Francis Xavier Church, Richmond
 St Peter's Church, Scarborough
 Stanbrook Abbey
 Thicket Priory
Ss Mary and Romuald, Yarm
Medieval parish churches of York
 The Shrine of Our Lady of Mount Grace
Bar Convent, York
St George's Roman Catholic Church, York
 More House, York
Shrine of St Margaret Clitherow, York
St Mary's Abbey, York
St John's in the Marsh Church, York
York Oratory

In the Diocese of Leeds:
St Robert's Church, Harrogate
 St Wilfrid's Church, Ripon
St Stephen's Church, Skipton

South Yorkshire
In the Roman Catholic Diocese of Hallam:
Cathedral Church of St Marie, Sheffield
Monastery of The Holy Spirit, Sheffield
Sacred Heart Church, Hillsborough, Sheffield
St Vincent's Church, Sheffield
Holy Rood Church, Barnsley
Our Lady of Doncaster
St Bede's Church, Rotherham

West Yorkshire
In the Diocese of Leeds:
Leeds Cathedral
Kirkstall Abbey, Leeds
Mount St Mary's Church, Leeds
Our Lady of Lourdes Church, Leeds
St Patrick's Church, Leeds
St Edward King and Confessor Catholic Church, Clifford
St Mary's Church, Halifax
St Patrick's Church, Bradford
St Patrick's Church, Huddersfield
St Austin's Church, Wakefield

Scotland

Sorted according the regions of Scotland, although there are two ecclesiastical provinces: Archdiocese of St Andrews and Edinburgh and the Archdiocese of Glasgow:

Central
In the Archdiocese of St Andrews and Edinburgh:
 St Mary's Church, Stirling

Fife
In the Archdiocese of St Andrews and Edinburgh:
 St James Church, St Andrews
 University of St Andrews Catholic Chaplaincy

Grampian
In the Diocese of Aberdeen:
 St Mary's Cathedral, Aberdeen
 St Peter's Church, Buckie
 St Thomas's Church, Keith
 St Gregory's Church, Preshome
 St Ninian's Church, Tynet
 Pluscarden Abbey (Benedictine)
 Greyfriars Sisters of Mercy Convent in Elgin (Dominicans)

Highlands
In the Diocese of Aberdeen:
 St Mary's Church, Inverness

In the Diocese of Argyll and the Isles
 Cille Choirill

Lothian
In the Archdiocese of St Andrews and Edinburgh:
 St David's Church, Dalkeith
 St Michael's Church, Linlithgow
 Sancta Maria Abbey, Nunraw (Trappists)

City of Edinburgh
 St Mary's Cathedral, Edinburgh
 Gillis Centre
 Sacred Heart, Edinburgh
 St Albert's Catholic Chaplaincy, Edinburgh
 St Columba's Catholic Church, Edinburgh
 St Ninian and Triduana's Church, Edinburgh
 St Patrick's Church, Edinburgh
 St Peter's Church, Edinburgh
 St John the Evangelist Church, Portobello
 St Joseph's Church, Edinburgh
 St Mary's Star of the Sea Church, Leith
 St Andrew's Ukrainian Catholic Church (Eparchy of the Holy Family)

Orkney
In the Diocese of Aberdeen:
 Italian Chapel

Strathclyde
In the Diocese of Argyll and the Isles:
 St Columba's Cathedral
 Craig Lodge Community

In the Diocese of Galloway:
 Ayr Cathedral
 Good Shepherd Cathedral, Ayr
 Church of St John, Cumnock

Greater Glasgow
In the Archdiocese of Glasgow:
 St Andrew's Cathedral, Glasgow
 Blessed John Duns Scotus Church, Glasgow
Saint Mary's, Calton
Our Lady of Good Counsel Church, Glasgow
Sacred Heart Church, Glasgow
St Aloysius Church, Glasgow
St Anne's Church, Glasgow
St Columba's Catholic Church, Glasgow
St Mungo's Church, Glasgow

In the Diocese of Motherwell:
 Motherwell Cathedral
 Carfin Grotto
 St Bride's Church, East Kilbride
 St Mary's Church, Lanark
 St Ignatius Church, Wishaw

In the Diocese of Paisley:
 St Mirin's Cathedral

Tayside
In the Diocese of Dunkeld:
 St Andrew's Cathedral, Dundee
 Church of the Holy Family, Dunblane
 St Mary, Our Lady of Victories Church, Dundee
 St John the Baptist Church, Perth
 St Mary's Monastery, Kinnoull (Redemptorists)

Western Isles
In the Diocese of Argyll and the Isles:
 St Michael's Church, Eriskay

Wales

Sorted according to the preserved counties of Wales, although all of Wales is in the ecclesiastical province of Cardiff:

Anglesey
In the Diocese of Wrexham:
 Our Lady Star of the Sea and St Winefride, Amlwch
 St Mary's Church, Holyhead

Clwyd
In the Diocese of Wrexham:
 Wrexham Cathedral
 St Joseph's Church, Colwyn Bay
 St Winefride's Church, Holywell
 St David's Church, Pantasaph
 Our Lady of the Assumption Church, Rhyl
 St Beuno's Jesuit Spirituality Centre

Dyfed
In the Diocese of Menevia:
 Our Lady of Cardigan
 Caldey Abbey
 Chapel of St Non
 Our Lady Queen of Peace Church, Llanelli

Gwent
In the Archdiocese of Cardiff:
 Church of Our Lady and St Michael, Abergavenny
 Church of St Mary and St Michael, Llanarth
 St Mary's Church, Monmouth
 St Patrick's Church, Newport
 St Michael's Church, Pillgwenlly
 St David Lewis and St Francis Xavier Church, Usk

Gwynedd
In the Diocese of Wrexham:
 St Tudwal's Church, Barmouth
 Our Lady of Seven Sorrows Church, Dolgellau

Mid Glamorgan
In the Archdiocese of Cardiff:
 Our Lady of Penrhys
 St Dyfrig's Church, Treforest

Powys
In the Diocese of Menevia:
 Our Lady of Ransom and the Holy Souls Church, Llandrindod Wells

South Glamorgan
In the Archdiocese of Cardiff:
 Cardiff Metropolitan Cathedral
 Church of Our Lady and St Michael, Abergavenny
 St Alban-on-the-Moors Church, Cardiff
 St Joseph's Church, Cardiff
 St Mary of the Angels Church, Cardiff
 St Patrick's Church, Cardiff
 St Peter's Church, Cardiff
 Church of St Mary and St Michael, Llanarth
 St Mary's Church, Monmouth
 St Patrick's Church, Newport
 Our Lady of Penrhys
 St Michael's Church, Pillgwenlly
 St David Lewis and St Francis Xavier Church, Usk

West Glamorgan
In the Diocese of Menevia:
 St Joseph's Cathedral, Swansea
 St Joseph's Church, Port Talbot

Northern Ireland
Sorted according to the counties of Northern Ireland, although there are also the Catholic dioceses in the ecclesiastical province of Armagh that also cover Northern Ireland: Armagh, Clogher, Derry, Down and Connor, Dromore, Kilmore.

Antrim 
Belfast
In the Diocese of Down and Connor:
St Peter's Cathedral, Belfast
Clonard Monastery
St Malachy's Church, Belfast
St Mary's Church, Belfast
St Patrick's Church, Belfast

Armagh 
In the Archdiocese of Armagh:
 St Patrick's Cathedral, Armagh

Derry 
In the Diocese of Derry:
 St Eugene's Cathedral
 St Columba's Church, Long Tower

Down 
In the Diocese of Dromore:
 Newry Cathedral

Tyrone 
In the Diocese of Derry:
 Sacred Heart Church, Plumbridge

See also
List of cathedrals in the United Kingdom (covers Roman Catholic and Anglican and/or other denomination's cathedrals)
 List of Catholic churches in Ireland
List of Roman Catholic churches in Leicester
 Parishes of the Eparchy of Holy Family of London for Ukrainians

References

Catholic
Lists of Roman Catholic churches